Preston is a neighborhood located in Cary, North Carolina. It is the largest neighborhood in Cary, and one of the largest in Wake County.

Preston was founded in 1993 by the SAS Institute. In 1992, SAS decided to start a neighborhood in the area, which would be called "Preston".

Preston is composed of many small neighborhoods, such as Preston Glenn, and Preston Pines. In general, Preston is considered affluent and educated.

Preston is known for its golf courses. The Prestonwood Country Club is located in Preston. The neighborhood is notable for events such as the SAS tournament that SAS started in 2000 after they had founded the neighborhood.

Neighborhoods in North Carolina
Geography of Cary, North Carolina
Populated places established in 1993